The Exciting Connie Francis is a studio album recorded by American pop singer Connie Francis. It is the second album Francis cut for MGM Records.

Background
After her breakthrough in early 1958 with her single Who's Sorry Now?, a rock 'n' roll oriented version of the 1923 standard, and a subsequent album of the same title, Francis chose to take a more adult approach to her second album. For The Exciting Connie Francis, she chose twelve American standards. Francis clearly marked the album as a concept album by dividing it into two sections with different moods: Side A is filled with songs differing between mid-tempo and up-tempo, while Side B consists solely of ballads.

The album was released in March 1959 on MGM Records 12" Album E-3761 (mono edition) and SE-3761 (stereo edition). It was repackaged and re-released in March 1962.

Track listing

Side A

Side B

Connie Francis albums
1959 albums
Albums arranged by Ray Ellis
Albums conducted by Ray Ellis
Albums produced by Ray Ellis
MGM Records albums